= Baggonal Mohra =

- Village
- Location within Pakistan
- Coordinates: 33.22°N 73.21°E
- Country: Pakistan
- Province: (Islamabad Capital Territory) Islamabad C.T
- Elevation: 455 m (1,493 ft)

Population
  - Total: 108,784
- Time zone: UTC+5 (PST)

Baggonal Mohra is a village in the Islamabad Capital Territory of Pakistan. It is located at 33° 22' 5N 73° 21' 35E with an altitude of 455 metres (1496 feet).
